Sultan Mubarak Al-Dawoodi (born 16 March 1985) is a Saudi Arabian discus thrower. He was born in Bisha.

His personal best is 65.52 metres, achieved in Biała Podlaska in June 2016. He had represented Saudi Arabia at the Summer Olympics three times (2008, 2012, and 2016), failing to reach the final on every occasion.

He was banned from competing for two years for doping.

Doping ban
Al-Dawoodi tested positive for norandrosterone in April 2009 and was subsequently banned from competing in sports for 2 years. The ban ended on 5 June 2011.

Achievements

References

External links

1985 births
Living people
Doping cases in athletics
Athletes (track and field) at the 2008 Summer Olympics
Athletes (track and field) at the 2012 Summer Olympics
Athletes (track and field) at the 2016 Summer Olympics
Asian Games medalists in athletics (track and field)
Athletes (track and field) at the 2002 Asian Games
Athletes (track and field) at the 2006 Asian Games
Athletes (track and field) at the 2014 Asian Games
Athletes (track and field) at the 2018 Asian Games
Olympic athletes of Saudi Arabia
Saudi Arabian male discus throwers
Saudi Arabian sportspeople in doping cases
Asian Games bronze medalists for Saudi Arabia
Medalists at the 2006 Asian Games
People from 'Asir Province
Islamic Solidarity Games competitors for Saudi Arabia
Islamic Solidarity Games medalists in athletics
20th-century Saudi Arabian people
21st-century Saudi Arabian people